Jones Worldwide (JWW) formerly Jones Music, is a Nigerian music and management company, providing Artist & Label services. The company is led by its chief executive officer Shay Jones, the former vice president, and Head of Artists and repertoire at The Aristokrat Group. Jones Worldwide currently houses artists Seyi Shay, Ijekimora, King Perryy, with producers Kel-P, and Bruno Aikore.

History
Jones Music was founded in 2014 by David "Shay" Olakot, and Wisdom "Wiz" Ehijele, as a record label. Following the end of a project licensing deal with the music duo Jones Lifestyle in 2016, the label paused all operations. In 2020, following the exit of the vice president of The Aristokrat Group, the company rebranded it name from Jones Music to Jones Worldwide, and began all operations.

On 17 February 2020,  the music company signed a strategic deal with Lifestyle image consultant, to help rebrand, visualize, and shape their image development. Same day, JWW signed its first artists Ijekimora, and Bruno Aikore since the transition from Jones Music. On 21 February 2021, King Perry signed a partnership deal with Jones Worldwide, to help conceptualize, and market his project Citizen of The World. Seyi Shay second studio album Big Girl, was executively produced by Jones Worldwide. The album was released on 10 December 2021, after her first debut album Seyi or Shay (2015). Big Girl features Jones Worldwide CEO; Shay Jones on "Mine".

On 1 September 2022, Jones CEO/MD: Shay Jones and COO: Wiz Jones, where on the cover of the first issue of TurnTable Industry Digest. On the magazine, the founders spoke about their journey, experience in Ghana and South Africa, their time in Aristokrat, being a former artiste and how it helps them as executives; during their conversation with TurnTable editor-in-chief Ayomide Oriowo.

Roster

Current acts

Former artists

Management

Discography

Albums/Mixtape/EP

Notes

References

Entertainment companies established in 2014
Record label distributors